Two Japanese warships have borne the name Tsubame:

 , a  launched in 1903 and stricken in 1923
 , a  launched in 1929 and sunk in 1945

Imperial Japanese Navy ship names
Japanese Navy ship names